The Vanity is a Victoria Racing Club Group 3 Thoroughbred horse race held under set weight conditions with penalties, for three-year-old fillies, over a distance of 1400 metres. It is held at Flemington Racecourse in Melbourne, Australia in February. Prizemoney is A$200,000.

History

Distance
 1987–1989 – 1400 metres
 1990 – 1200 metres
 1991–1993 – 1400 metres
 1994 – 1420 metres
 1995 – 1432 metres
 1996 – 1433 metres
 1997–2006 – 1400 metres
 2007 – 1200 metres
 2008–2011 – 1400 metres
 2012 – 1410 metres
 2013 onwards - 1400 metres

Grade
 1987–1999 - Listed race
 2000 onwards - Group 3 race

Venue
 1997 - Sandown Racecourse
 2007 - Moonee Valley Racecourse

Winners
	
 2023 - Wollombi
 2022 - Barb Raider
 2021 – Zou Dancer
2020 – Bonvicini
2019 – Amphitrite
2018 – Rimraam
 2017 – Kenedna
 2016 – Don't Doubt Mamma
 2015 – Sweet And Speedy
 2014 – Solicit
 2013 – Alzora
 2012 – Shopaholic
 2011 – Southern Speed
 2010 – Tallow
 2009 – Romneya
 2008 – Musidora
 2007 – Universal Queen
 2006 – Pure Joy
 2005 – Ballet Society
 2004 – Country Lodge
 2003 – Dextrous
 2002 – Gold Lottey
 2001 – Lan Kwai Fong
 2000 – Forest Express
 1999 – Rose O' War
 1998 – Greeting
 1997 – Akarana
 1996 – Saleous
 1995 – No Mischief
 1994 – Balm In Gilead
 1993 – Classy Twiggy
 1992 – Northern Bisque
 1991 – Irish Spree
 1990 – Dancer's Choice
 1989 – Very Droll
 1988 – Tennessee Vain
 1987 – Pseudonym Miss

See also
 List of Australian Group races
 Group races

References

Horse races in Australia
Flemington Racecourse
Recurring sporting events established in 1987